Epipremnum carolinense is a flowering plant. Epipremnum carolinense belongs to the genus Epipremnum, and family Araceae. 

This species' native range is the Caroline Islands, part of Micronesia and Palau.

References 

carolinense